Medical Care Research and Review is a peer-reviewed academic journal that covers the field of health care. The editor-in-chief is Thomas D'Aunno (Columbia University Mailman School of Public Health). It was established in 1944 and is currently published by SAGE Publishing.

The journal publishes three types of articles:  review articles on particular research or policy topics that synthesize theoretical and empirical literature across several disciplines; empirical research; and articles that present new data and trends in the health care field.

Abstracting and indexing 
The journal is abstracted and indexed in:

According to the Journal Citation Reports, its 2014 impact factor is 2.600, ranking it 25 out of 86 journals in the category "Health Care Sciences & Services" and 12 out of 70 journals in the category "Health Policy & Services".

Best Article Award 
Each year, the journal's editorial board selects a "Best Paper", selected based on the quality of the work and its contribution to the field.

Notable papers 
The following papers have been cited most often, according to the Web of Science:

References

External links 
 

SAGE Publishing academic journals
English-language journals
Healthcare journals
Bimonthly journals
Publications established in 1944